Polar Towers is a complex of two towers located in Plaza Venezuela, east of Caracas, Venezuela. It is the headquarters of Empresas Polar, and is formed by the east tower and the west tower.

East tower
Construction began in 1951 and ended in 1954 and is considered the first skyscraper built in Caracas for its innovative architecture.

West tower
Construction began in 1994 and ended in 1997, with an estimated cost of 2.5 billion old bolivars, equivalent to 2,500,000 Bs.F. It has  of plants, parking for 575 vehicles, a convention center for 400 people, and a panoramic view of the Park Los Caobos and Botanical Garden.

The top of the west tower had advertising for Pepsi. In 2010 it was removed because its fragments were disintegrating after spending several years on the roof.

External links
 Emporis.com
 Complex information

Buildings and structures completed in 1954
Buildings and structures completed in 1997
Buildings and structures in Caracas
1995 establishments in Venezuela
Convention centers in Venezuela
Twin towers
Skyscraper office buildings in Venezuela